Einstein's Bridge may refer to:

Einstein's Bridge (novel), a novel by John Cramer
Einstein–Rosen bridge, a particular property of a black hole